The production of coffee in Paraguay began in the late 19th century. Plantations were known at that time near Asunción and Limpio.

History
In 1889, there were 83,966 coffee trees in the country; considering the similarity of soil and climatic conditions between Paraguay and Brazil, it was surmised then that the coffee produced in Paraguay would be as good as that produced in Brazil. Initially, coffee was grown in areas where soil and weather conditions suited such growth and on a small scale. Commercially viable plantations in the country were started only after many experimental plantations proved successful. This was followed by the Banco Agricola of Paraguay providing funds to several government agencies to freely distribute the plants to farmers for cultivation. Thousands of trees were planted in plantations in the mountains of Alto Paraguay, not far from the city of Asunción. In each plantation, the average number of trees planted varied from 1,500 to 2,000 with a maximum of 10,000 trees in one plantation. 

Plantations in northern Paraguay was established in 1967.  Most of the coffee produced in the plantations were found acceptable for domestic consumption. In the 1970s, the main coffee producing areas were noted to be the Amambay, Alto Parana, and Canindeyú departments. 

Coffea arabica production was 180 tons in 2006 and export amounted to 36 tons.

References

Bibliography

Agriculture in Paraguay
Paraguay
Economy of Paraguay